The B3 Passat was heavily facelifted in 1993, and despite being designated B4, it was not an all-new model. The facelift resulted in every external body panel being changed, except for the roof and glasshouse, with most obvious exterior change seeing the reintroduction of a grille to match the style of the other same-generation Volkswagen models of the era, such as the Mk3 Golf and Jetta. The interior was mildly updated and included safety equipment such as dual front airbags and seat belt pretensioners, although the basic dashboard design remained unchanged. The B4 sedan was replaced in late 1996 by the new B5 Passat.

The car was available with a range of engines, including a Turbocharged Direct Injection (TDI) diesel engine - an inline four-cylinder 1.9 liter turbodiesel. It carried a U.S. EPA fuel efficiency rating for the sedan of  highway. Combined with a  fuel tank, it had a 1300+ km (800+ mi) range on a single tank of fuel. The B4 TDI wagon saw less than 1,000 sales in the U.S. during its 1996 to 1997 lifespan.

B4 trim levels 

In Europe, L, CL, GL, GT and VR6 versions were available; with the VR6 offered alongside the trims, for example a GL VR6. Only three trim levels were available in the United States: GLS, GLX and TDI. The GLS had a 2.0-litre, SOHC 8-valve I4 engine, while the TDI had the 1.9-litre TurboDiesel. Motor Trend measured a 0-60 mph (97 km/h) time of 7.9 seconds for the 1993 Passat GLX.

Canadian versions of the Passat were similar to models sold in the U.S. Unlike the U.S., however, Canadian models were offered with the AAZ 1.9-liter TurboDiesel, but for the 1995 models only. The 1.9-liter TurboDiesel was replaced by the 1.9 TDI (1Z/AHU) in 1996.

The only version sold in Mexico was the 2.8-liter VR6 gasoline in GLX trim. These versions were more expensive than the Volkswagen cars built in Mexico, due to the import tariffs, and the fact the Passat was built in Germany.

B4 engines 
The following internal combustion engines were available in the B4 Passat:

References 

Passat B4
Front-wheel-drive vehicles
All-wheel-drive vehicles
Cars powered by VR engines
Cars introduced in 1993
Station wagons
simple:Volkswagen Passat#Passat Mk4